Alina Janowska (16 April 1923 – 13 November 2017) was a Polish actress. She appeared in more than 35 films and television shows between 1946 and 2017.

Biography
Janowska was born in 1923 in Warsaw into a wealthy family. She was arrested on the night of 23 April 1942, accused of collaborating with the underground and helping a Jewish family. She was imprisoned for 7 months in Pawiak in Warsaw. She took part in the Warsaw Uprising, acting as a liaison officer for the Battalion "Kiliński".

In 1963 she married Polish architect and fencer Wojciech Zabłocki. The couple had two children. She has had a daughter from her first marriage.

Career
She debuted in theatre in 1943. From 1945 to 1965 she was employed in the Warsaw theater Teatr Syrena. Later she played in Zakazane piosenki (1946), the first Polish film after World War II. 

In the 1940s she acted in movies, such as Treasure (dir. by Leonard Buczkowski). Her most important role from this period was the Yugoslav Dessa in The Last Stage (1947) directed by Wanda Jakubowska. The film was nominated for the Grand International Award at the Venice Film Festival in 1948, and for a BAFTA Award for Best Film from any Source in 1950.

In the early 1950s she disappeared from the screens and stages to take care of her family. She only dubbed in a few Polish-language version Soviet films. After eleven years, she returned to the cinema. She played the main character Lucyna in Samson (1961) directed by Andrzej Wajda. The film was nominated for a Golden Lion in 1961 at the Venice Film Festival. In the same year she dubbed Drizella in a Polish-language version of Cinderella. In the years 1965-1966 she appeared in the popular TV series Wojna domowa. From 1966 to 1981 she was employed in the Polish Teatr Komedia w Warszawie. From 1997 to 2010 she played in soap opera Złotopolscy as Eleonora Gabriel. From 2010 to 2011 she played in Plebania.

Alina Janowska died on 13 November 2017, aged 94, from Alzheimer's disease.

Filmography

References

External links

1923 births
2017 deaths
Polish film actresses
Actresses from Warsaw
Deaths from Alzheimer's disease
Deaths from dementia in Poland